The Tiroler Liga (officially known as the UPC Tirol Liga) is the top division of Tyrol and the fourth-highest division in Austrian football. The competition is organized by the Tirol Football Association. The Tyrolean champion is allowed to start in the Austrian Regional League West, and the two last placed relegate to Landesliga Ost and Landesliga West. In the 2015/16 season, SV Wörgl was able to secure the championship.

2022–23 member clubs 

SK Ebbs
SV Innsbruck
Innsbrucker AC
SV Kematen
SV Kirchbichl
SVG Mayrhofen
SC Mils 05
SC Münster
FC Natters
SV Oberperfuss
SPG Pruta/Serfaus
SK St. Johann
Union Innsbruck
FC Volders
Völser SV
FC Wacker Innsbruck

External links
 Tyrollean football association

References

Football competitions in Austria
Sport in Tyrol (state)